Rauvolfia micrantha, the small-flowered snakeroot, is a plant that is indigenous to southwestern India, southern Thailand, and Vietnam. It has a woody, shrub-like appearance and attractive flowers.

Distribution and habitat
The general habitat of plants in the genus Rauvolfia is semi-evergreen and evergreen forest distributed along tropical areas of Asia, Africa, and America. The plant is endemic to the evergreen forest of the Tinnevelly and Travancore hills in the Indian Western Ghats (states of Kerala and Tamil Nadu. It flowers and fruits between March and October.

Conservation
Rauvolfia micrantha is a critically endangered plant. The species has scanty distribution in the wild due to habitat degradation, fragmentation of population and narrow environmental niche. Efforts toward its conservation involve cryopreservation of seeds and in-vitro methods. Organogenesisis the standardized protocol for regeneration of R. micrantha in culture. Nodes of the plant are used as explants. Cryopreservation of the seeds has proven to be slightly difficult. The seeds of R. micrantha are of intermediate type and hence require strict conditions during this process.

Morphology, flowers and fruits
Branches are slender and glabrous (having no trichomes or "hair"). The leaves are approximately  x , elliptic, membranous, abruptly acuminate at both ends; petiole 1 cm long. Capsule is  x , ovoid acute, and glabrous. Fruits are obliquely ovate and pointed.

Rauvolfia micrantha is related to the snakeroot plant (Rauvolfia serpentina) which is used as a traditional herbal medicine. However, isoenzyme analysis reveals that it is more closely related to Rauvolfia tetraphylla L.

Reproduction
Flowering reaches its peak in the month of May and anthesis occurs between 5:00 am and 8:30 am with a peak at 7:00 am. Dehiscence occurs between 6:00 am and 10:30 am on the day of the anthesis. The stigmas are receptive the day before anthesis, however, become increasingly receptive on the day of anthesis. The major insect pollinators included Apis florea (honeybee), Oecophylla smargadina (red ant), Tetragonula iridipennis (pollen bee) and butterflies such as Pachliopta aristolochaea, Pachliopta hector, Delias eucharis and Euploea core.

Alkaloids
Hairy root induction of the plant is achieved in culture by using infection with Agrobacterium rhizogenes strains. 
 Hairy root: ajmaline, ajmalacine, reserpine, reserpiline, sarpagine, and serpentine 
 Root bark: aunamine and neosarpagine
Other nutrients and chemicals in the plant include phenolics, flavonoids, vitamins and carotenoids. The extracts also had antioxidant properties in vitro.

Uses
The plant is used as a substitute for R. serpentina in Ayurvedic practices in Kerala, India for nervous disorders such as insomnia and insanity.

References

Flora of Asia
Endangered plants
Plants described in 1882
micrantha